Morné is a South African or Namibian masculine given name. Notable people with the name include:

 Morné du Plessis (born 1949), former South African rugby union player
 Morné Engelbrecht (born 1988), South African-born Namibian cricketer
 Morné Hanekom (born 1988), South African rugby union player
 Morné Karg (born 1977), Namibian cricketer
 Morné Morkel (born 1984), South African cricketer
 Morné Nagel (born 1978), South African sprinter
 Morné Schreuder (born 1979), Namibian rugby union player
 Morné Steyn (born 1984), South African rugby union player
 Morné van Wyk (born 1979), South African cricketer

See also
 Morne (disambiguation)

Masculine given names